Auliekol is a lake in the Ekibastuz City Administration, Pavlodar Region, Kazakhstan. The name "Auliekol" means holy lake in Kazakh. 

Auliekol lakeshore includes one of the important archaeological sites of the region. There are the ruins of an ancient settlement with the remains of a hillfort close to the Olenti river mouth by the western shore of the lake.

Geography
Auliekol is an endorheic lake belonging to the Irtysh basin. The Irtysh flows  to the east of the eastern shores of the lake. 

The Olenti river flows into the western lakeshore. There are a number of smaller lakes in the vicinity of Auliekol. Issensor (Есенсор), a salt flat, lies close to the southwestern shore of Auliekol. The area surrounding the lake is mostly flat steppe used for local livestock grazing.

Flora
The vegetation of the lakeshore zone includes spear grass, wormwood, wiregrass, akshityr and sedges.

See also
Sor (geomorphology)

References

External links

Archaeological excavations on Auliekol
Five sacred places added to Kazakhstan's Holy Places project

Lakes of Kazakhstan
Pavlodar Region
Endorheic basins of Asia
Irtysh basin